Operation Easy Chair was a joint covert operation of the US Central Intelligence Agency, the Dutch Internal Security Service (BVD), and the Dutch Radar Laboratory (NRP) from 1958-1962. The goal of the operation was to place a covert listening device in the office of the Russian Ambassador in The Hague. Named for a bug the CIA claimed to have found in a chair, the operation was a response to the discovery of The Thing—a passive covert listening device discovered in the Great Seal gifted to the American Embassy in Moscow by the Young Pioneer organization of the Soviet Union. The operation resulted in the creation of several devices, notably Easy Chair Mark I (1955), Mark II (1956), Mark III (1958), Mark IV (1961) and Mark V (1962). Although initially they could not get the resonant cavity microphone to work reliably, several products involving Passive Elements were developed for the CIA as a result of the research. In 1965, the NRP finally got a reliably working pulsed cavity resonator, but by that time the CIA was no longer interested in passive devices, largely because of the high levels of RF energy involved.

Bugs implanted 
On 10 April 1987, the Soviets held a press conference and revealed that their embassy in Washington had been bugged by the Americans. The image of the bug has been identified as an SRT-56, a bug developed by NRP, speculated to be part of the Easy Chair program.

Devices created

References 

Espionage
Espionage devices
 
Central Intelligence Agency operations
Netherlands–United States relations